The University of California, San Diego Performance-Based Skills Assessment (UPSA) was created by Dr. Thomas L. Patterson to provide a more reliable measure of every day functioning in patients with schizophrenia than the previously utilized methods such as self-report, clinician ratings or direct observation.

History
While everyday functioning has long been known to be affected in those with schizophrenia, the focus of testing and treatment had traditionally been on the symptoms of psychosis. As everyday functioning is fundamental for patients with cognitive impairment, the focal point has shifted towards accurate assessment of everyday functional capabilities.

Self-reporting or observations by a clinician have been the most common instruments used to assess everyday functioning, but these methods have weaknesses. For example, when using the self-report method, interference by the subject's psychopathy in the perception of their abilities can cause results to be distorted, and in the case of clinicians’ ratings, patients are typically only observed for a short duration, so clinicians may not be capable of comprehensively evaluating the patient's ability to perform daily tasks.

Dr. Thomas L. Patterson created the University of California, San Diego (UCSD) Performance-Based Skills Assessment (UPSA) to provide clinicians with a standardized set of tasks to assess a participant's real-world abilities. During an UPSA evaluation, participants perform every day activities under a clinician's direction. As a performance-based assessment, the UPSA has been found to be less vulnerable to error than self-report by the participant as it doesn't rely on the participant's level of awareness of their own abilities. The UPSA has been shown to be predictive of outcomes such as employment status, independence, and social skills, and shows a strong correlation with neuropsychological deficits.

Description 
The UPSA is a role-play test in which participants are asked to utilize props to demonstrate how well they perform every day activities. Depending on the version, the UPSA is a paper-and-pen or electronic cognitive assessment that evaluates up to 6 domains of every day functioning: 
 Household Management
 Communication
 Financial Skills
 Transportation
 Comprehension/Planning
 Medication Management

Administration 

The Household Management, Communication, Transportation, Comprehension and Planning and Medication Management domains consist of one task each. The Financial Skills domain consists of two tasks. Depending on the version used, the assessment will encompass all or some of the following sub tests:

Versions

UPSA-2 
A general version that allows for nationwide use in the United States. It uses all subscales, including Medication Management, and is intended for use in both small studies, and large multi-site clinical trials.

UPSA-B (Brief) 
A shorter version of the UPSA-2 that uses only the financial skills and communication skills subscales (i.e. counting change, telephone calls, and paying bills). This version of the UPSA takes approximately 15 minutes to complete and has been shown to be an accurate predictor of patient ability to live independently, as compared to the full version of the UPSA. When used outside of the United States, the check-writing portion of the UPSA -B is replaced with a verbal response portion for populations with little to no familiarity with check writing.

UPSA-2-VIM (Validation of Intermediate Measures) 
A full version of the UPSA-2, excluding the medication management task.

UPSA-2-ER (Extended Range) 
A full version of the UPSA-2, containing additional questions to increase the level of difficulty for each subscale.

C-UPSA (Computerized) 
A computer-based version of the UPSA that requires either a laptop or a desktop computer for test administration.  It was created to meet the demand of a more portable and less material-heavy everyday functioning assessment.  Validation studies found that the UPSA and C-UPSA scores were significantly correlated and that the C-UPSA provided increased benefits to the users, including a decreased administration time and minimization of examiner impact on performance.

UPSA-M (Mobile) 
An iOS tablet-based mobile application version of the UPSA, successive of the C-UPSA. Advantages of the UPSA-M include standardized instructions, audio recording of the subject's responses, easier administration, and the option to administer the entire UPSA or the UPSA-B through the same program. Additionally, the tablet touch-screen design mimics real-life.

Use
Various versions of the UPSA have been used in multiple phase 2 and 3 clinical trials, as well as academic studies in populations with schizophrenia, bipolar disorder, Alzheimer's disease, mild cognitive impairment (MCI), psychosis, and others. Translated and localized versions of the UPSA-2, UPSA-2-VIM, UPSA-2ER and UPSA-B are available for international use.

Other Cognitive Assessment Tools 
SCoRS - Schizophrenia Cognition Rating Scale
VRFCAT - Virtual Reality Functional Capacity Assessment Tool

References

External links
Official website

Cognitive tests